The Motif-Index of Folk-Literature is a six volume catalogue of motifs, granular elements of folklore, composed by American folklorist Stith Thompson (1932–1936, revised and expanded 1955–1958). Often referred to as Thompson's motif-index, the catalogue has been extensively used in folklore studies, where folklorists commonly use it in tandem with the Aarne–Thompson–Uther Index, an index used for folktale type analysis.

As standard tools 

The motif-index and the AT or ATU indices are regarded as standard tools in the study of folklore.  For example, folklorist Mary Beth Stein said that, "Together with Thompson's six-volume Motif-Index of Folk-Literature, with which it is cross-indexed, The Types of Folktale constitutes the most important reference work and research tool for comparative folk-tale analysis. Alan Dundes, who was an outspoken critic, also said substantially the same thing, without confining the application to comparative studies: "[the indices] index constitute two of the most valuable tools in the professional folklorist's arsenal of aids for analysis".

Concise outlines of both indices appear in Thompson's The Folktale (1946).

Terminology
In the context of the index, Thompson has defined motif as follows: "A motif is the smallest element in a tale having a power to persist in tradition. In order to have this power it must have something unusual and striking about it".

But in the Motif-index itself, Thompson had also provided a more "cautious" definition: "[a]nything that goes to make up a traditional narrative ... When the term motif is employed, it is always in a very loose sense, and is made to include any of the elements of narrative structure".

This use of the noun motif is specialized to the field of folklore studies. According to the Oxford English Dictionary, folkloristic use of the noun motif is not summed up in the definition for literary criticism (“Motif,” def. 3a), but deserves its own separate sense of this definition (“Motif,” def. 3b). Similarly, the compound noun motif index is used in cultural anthropology to denote "an index of standard motifs, esp. those found in folk tales".

System
Thompson discusses composing the Motif-Index of Folk-Literature in his autobiography, A Folklorist's Progress: Reflection of a Scholar's Life. In producing the motif-index, Thompson built upon the research of Finnish folklorist Antti Aarne, who in 1910 published an index of European tale-types. Thompson himself had revised this in 1928 to cover the region from Europe to Asia: this is known as the Aarne-Thompson tale type index. In his Motif-Index, Thompson then compiled, classified, and numbered the traditional motifs of the mostly European folktale types in the tale-type index.

Thompson's motif-index organizes thousands of motifs. Entries are first organized by an umbrella topic (for example, category S is "Unnatural Cruelty"). Entries are then divided into more specific subcategories. For example, entry S50 "Cruel relatives-in-law" contains the sub-entry S51.1 "Cruel mother-in-law plans death of daughter-in-law". Thompson's The Folktale includes the following overview of the motif-index:

Relation to tale-type index 
The idea has been expressed that a combined set of motifs (in the motif-index) may constitute a folktale narrative (cf. the description of the Motif-Index as "a huge catalogue of folk narratives elements that may variously combine to form whole folk narratives" by Jan Harold Brunvand).

This idea had already been anticipated by Alexander Veselovsky who wrote that "cluster of motifs" constituted a "plot", influencing Russian formalists like Vladimir Propp, whose study prefigured Stith Thompson's Motif-Index, as has been pointed out.

In the book The Folktale, Stith Thompson invokes this phrase "cluster of motifs" in several passages, as here, in connection with tales involving the dead helper:
 The chain of circumstances by which this helper joins the hero and certain details of his later experience are so uniform and well articulated as to form an easily recognizable motif, or rather cluster of motifs. This fact has caused some confusion to scholars who have not sufficiently distinguished between such a motif and the entire tale of which it forms only an important part.

But in this instance, Thompson is warning that the motif cluster is rather "only a framework for the adventures of the hero", containing "at least three different tales within".
 
Thompson also explains that a single motif may be found in numerous folktales “from all parts of the earth” (383).

Editions (print and digitised)

Print editions
 Stith Thompson, Motif-Index of Folk-Literature: A Classification of Narrative Elements in Folk-Tales, Ballads, Myths, Fables, Mediaeval Romances, Exempla, Fabliaux, Jest-Books, and Local Legends, FF Communications, 106–109, 116–117, 6 vols (Helsinki: Suomalainen Tiedeakatemia/Academia Scientiarum Fennica, 1932–36)/Indiana University Studies, 96–97, 100–101, 105–106, 108–112, 6 vols (Bloomington, Ind, 1932–1936).
 Stith Thompson, Motif-Index of Folk-Literature: A Classification of Narrative Elements in Folk-Tales, Ballads, Myths, Fables, Mediaeval Romances, Exempla, Fabliaux, Jest-Books, and Local Legends, rev. and enl. edn, 6 vols (Copenhagen: Rosenkilde and Bagger, 1955–58).

Digitisations of the second edition (book format)
 Reissued on CD-ROM Bloomington: Indiana University Press, 1993.

Other motif indices
Many folklorists have produced extensive motif and tale-type indices for culture areas not covered by Thompson, or covered only to a limited extent. For surveys, see
 Azzolina, David S. 1987. Tale type- and motif-indexes: An annotated bibliography. New York, London: Garland.
 

Examples of related folklore studies indices include the following:
Baughman, Ernest (1966). Type and Motif-Index of the Folktales of England and North America.
Boberg, Inger M. (1966). Motif-Index of Early Icelandic Literature. Bibliotheca Arnamagnæana 27. Copenhagen: Munksgaard.
Bordman, Gerald (1963). Motif-Index of the English Metrical Romances.
Bray, Dorothy Ann (1992). A list of motifs in the lives of the early Irish saints. FF Communications 252. Helsinki: Academia Scientiarum Fennica.
Cross, Tom Peete (1952). Motif-Index of Early Irish Literature. Indiana University Publications, Folklore Series 7. Bloomington: Indiana University.
El-Shamy, Hasan (1995). Folk Traditions in the Arab World: A Guide to Motif Classification. 2 Vols. Bloomington: Indiana University Press.
El-Shamy, Hasan (2006). Motif Index of The Thousand and One Nights. Bloomington: Indiana University Press.
Frenzel, Elisabeth (62008). Motive der Weltliteratur: Ein Lexikon dichtungsgeschichtlicher Längsschnitte. Stuttgart: Kroener. 
Goldberg, Harriet (1998). Motif-index of medieval Spanish folk narratives.
Goldberg, Harriet (2000). Motif-index of folk narratives in the pan-Hispanic romancero.
Guerreau-Jalabert, Anita (1992). Index des Motifs Narratifs dans les Romans Arthuriens Français en Vers (XIIe-XIIIe Siècles)/Motif-Index of French Arthurian Verse Romances (12th-13th century). Publications Romanes et Françaises 202. Geneva: Droz.
 Haboucha, Reginetta (1992). Types and motifs of the Judeo-Spanish folktales. New York, London: Garland.
Jason, Heda (2000). Motif, type, and genre: a manual for compilation of indices & a bibliography of indices and indexing.
 Kirtley, Bacil F. A Motif-Index of Traditional Polynesian Narratives. Honolulu: University of Hawai'i Press, 1971. Accessed September 11, 2021. doi:10.2307/j.ctvp2n3hb.
 Kristić, Branislav (1984). Indeks motiva narodnih pesama balkanskih Slovena. Ed. I. Nikolié. Belgrad: Minerva.
 Lichtblau, K., S. Obermayer, and C. Tuczay, (1982). Motiv-Index der deutschsprachigen weltlichen Erzählliteratur von den Anfangen bis 1400. Fabula 23: 293–95.
 Marzolph, Ulrich (1983). Motiv-Index der arabischen literarischen Anekdote. Fabula 24: 275–7.
Neugaard, Edward (1993). Motif-index of medieval Catalan folktales. Binghamton, N.Y: Center for Medieval and Early Renaissance Studies.
 Neuland, Lena (1981). Motif-index of Latvian folktales and legends. FF Communications 229. Helsinki: Academia Scientiarum Fennica.
 Sakaoǧlu, S. (1980). Anadolu-tiur efsanelerinde tas kesilme motifi ve efsanelerin tip katalogu. Ankara: Ankara Universitesi Basemev.
 Smith, R. E. (1980). Type-index and motif-index of the Roman de Renard. Uppsala: Etnologiska Institutionen.
 Tracy, Ann B. (1981). The gothic novel 1790-1830: Plot summaries and index to motifs. Lexington: University Press of Kentucky.
Wurzbach, Natascha and Simone Salz (1995). Motif index of the Child corpus: The English and Scottish popular ballad. Berlin: de Gruyter.

See also
Comparative mythology

Notes

References

Citations

Sources 

Dundes, Alan. 1997. "The Motif-Index and the Tale Type Index: A Critique." Journal of Folklore Research 34(3): 195–202. 

 Thompson, Stith. 1996. A Folklorist's Progress: Reflections of a Scholar's Life. Indiana University Press. 
 Thompson, Stith. 1977 [1946]. The Folktale. University of California Press. 
Uther, Hans-Jörg. 2004. "The Types of International Folktales: A Classification and Bibliography. Based on the system of Antti Aarne and Stith Thompson". FF Communications, no. 284–286. Helsinki: Suomalainen Tiedeakatemia. Three volumes. I.

External links 

 Digital copy via HathiTrust

Works about folklore
1932 books
1955 books
Recurring elements in folklore
Classification systems